Japan competed at the 1968 Winter Olympics in Grenoble, France.

As Sapporo would be the host city for the following Winter Olympics, the flag of Japan was raised at the closing ceremony.

Alpine skiing

Men

Men's slalom

Women

Biathlon

Men

 1 One minute added per close miss (a hit in the outer ring), two minutes added per complete miss.

Men's 4 x 7.5 km relay

 2 A penalty loop of 200 metres had to be skied per missed target.

Cross-country skiing

Men

Men's 4 × 10 km relay

Women

Figure skating

Men

Women

Ice hockey

Consolation round 
Teams in this group play for 9th-14th places. Japan entered in this round, from the start they did not play for a medal.

 Yugoslavia –  Japan 5:1 (2:0, 0:0, 3:1)
Goalscorers: Tisler 2, Beravs, Felc, Mlakar – Iwamoto.

 Japan –   Norway  4:0 (2:0, 2:0, 0:0)
Goalscorers: Okajima 2, Ebina, Araki.

 Japan –  Romania 5:4 (3:0, 1:3, 1:1)
Goalscorers: Hikigi 2, Araki, Itoh, Kudo – Florescu, Pana, Mois, Ionescu.

 Japan –  Austria  11:1 (1:0, 6:0, 4:1)
Goalscorers: Itoh 2, Okajima 2, Hikigi 2, Araki, Kudo, Takashima, Toriyabe, Iwamoto – Puschnig.

 France –  Japan 2:6 (0:0, 0:4, 2:2)
Goalscorers: Mazza, Faucomprez – Ebina 2, Hikigi, Itoh, Okajima, Araki.

Contestants
10. JAPAN
Goaltenders: Kazudži Morišima, Tošimitsu Ótsubo
Defence: Isao Asai, Mičihiro Sató, Hisaši Kasai, Toru Itabaši, Takaaki Kaneiri, Kendži Toriyanbe.
Forwards: Mamoru Takašima, Kimihisa Kudó, Kodži Iwamoto, Takao Hikigi, Toru Okadžima, Minoru Itó, Takeši Akiba, Yutaka Ebina, Kazuo Matsuda, Nobuhiro Araki.

Nordic combined 

Events:
 normal hill ski jumping 
 15 km cross-country skiing

Ski jumping

Speed skating

Men

Women

References
Official Olympic Reports
Japan Olympic Committee database
 Olympic Winter Games 1968, full results by sports-reference.com

Nations at the 1968 Winter Olympics
1968
Winter Olympics